Ole Hegge (September 3, 1898 – June 2, 1994) was a Norwegian cross-country skier and ski jumper who competed in the late 1920s and early 1930s.

Hegge was born in Bardu. His best-known finish was a silver medal in the 18 km event at the 1928 Winter Olympics in St. Moritz. Hegge also finished fifth in the 50 km event in 1928, fourth in the 50 km event at the 1932 Winter Olympics in Lake Placid, New York, and fourth in the 50 km event at the 1926 Nordic skiing World Championships. He died in Livingston, New York.

Cross-country skiing results
All results are sourced from the International Ski Federation (FIS).

Olympic Games
 1 medal – (1 silver)

World Championships

References

External links
 
 

1898 births
1994 deaths
Cross-country skiers at the 1928 Winter Olympics
Cross-country skiers at the 1932 Winter Olympics
Norwegian male cross-country skiers
Olympic cross-country skiers of Norway
Olympic silver medalists for Norway
Olympic medalists in cross-country skiing
Medalists at the 1928 Winter Olympics
People from Bardu
Sportspeople from Troms og Finnmark